Cephalaspidomorphs are a group of jawless fishes named for Cephalaspis of the osteostracans.  Most biologists regard this taxon as extinct, but the name is sometimes used in the classification of lampreys, because lampreys were once thought to be related to cephalaspids.  If lampreys are included, they would extend the known range of the group from the Silurian and Devonian periods to the present day. They are the closest relatives of jawed fishes, who emerged from within them and they would survive if the jawed fish are included.

Biology and morphology

Cephalaspidomorphi were, like most contemporary fishes, very well armoured. The head shield was particularly well developed, protecting the head, gills and the anterior section of the viscera. The body was in most forms well armoured as well. The head shield had a series of grooves over the whole surface, forming an extensive lateral line organ. The eyes were rather small and placed on the top of the head. There was no jaw proper. The mouth opening was surrounded by small plates, making the lips flexible, but without any ability to bite.

No internal skeleton is known, outside of the head shield. If they had a vertebral column at all, it would have been cartilage rather than bone. Likely, the axial skeleton consisted of an unsegmented notochord. A fleshy appendage emerged laterally on each side, behind the head shield, functioning as pectoral fins. The tail had a single, wrap-around tail-fin. Modern fishes with such a tail are rarely quick swimmers, and the cephalaspidomorphi were not likely very active animals. They probably spent much of their time semi-submerged in the mud. They also lacked a swim bladder, and would not have been able to keep afloat without actively swimming. The head shield provided some lift though, and would have made the cephalaspidomorphi better swimmers than most of their contemporaries. The whole group were likely algae- or filter-feeders, combing the bottom for small animals, much like the modern armoured bottom feeders, such as Loricariidae or Hoplosternum catfish.

Classification 
In the 1920s, the biologists Johan Kiær and Erik Stensiö first recognized the Cephalaspidomorphi as including the osteostracans, anaspids, and lampreys, because all three groups share a single dorsal "nostril", now known as a nasohypophysial opening.

Since then, opinions on the relations among jawless vertebrates have varied.  Most workers have come to regard the agnatha as paraphyletic, having given rise to the jawed fishes.  Because of shared features such as paired fins, the origins of the jawed vertebrates may lie close to the Cephalaspidomorphi.  Many biologists no longer use the name Cephalaspidomorphi because relations among Osteostraci and Anaspida are unclear, and the affinities of the lampreys are also contested.  Others have restricted the cephalaspidomorphs to include only groups more clearly related to the Osteostraci, such as Galeaspida and Pituriaspida, that were largely unknown in the 1920s.

Lampreys 
Some reference works and databases have regarded Cephalaspidomorphi as a Linnean class whose sole living representatives are the lampreys.
Evidence now suggests that lampreys acquired the characters they share with cephalaspids by convergent evolution.

As such, many newer works about fishes classify lampreys in a separate group called Petromyzontida or Hyperoartia.

References

Janvier, Philippe. Early Vertebrates. Oxford, New York: Oxford University Press, 1998.

External links
 The Tree of Life discusses relations among jawless fish

Paleozoic jawless fish
Silurian first appearances
Devonian extinctions